Qaleh-ye Sardar (also Romanized as Qal‘eh-ye Sardār; also known as Ghal‘eh Sardar) is a village in Choghamish Rural District, Choghamish District, Dezful County, Khuzestan Province, Iran. At the 2006 census, its population was 283, in 55 families.

References 

Populated places in Dezful County